A pandiagonal magic square or panmagic square (also diabolic square, diabolical square or diabolical magic square) is a magic square with the additional property that the broken diagonals, i.e. the diagonals that wrap round at the edges of the square, also add up to the magic constant.

A pandiagonal magic square remains pandiagonally magic not only under rotation or reflection, but also if a row or column is moved from one side of the square to the opposite side.  As such, an  pandiagonal magic square can be regarded as having  orientations.

3×3 pandiagonal magic squares

It can be shown that non-trivial pandiagonal magic squares of order 3 do not exist.  Suppose the square

is pandiagonally magic with magic constant . Subtracting  and  we get . 
However, if we move the third column in front and perform the same argument, we obtain . In fact, using the symmetries of 3 × 3 magic squares, all cells must equal . Therefore, all 3 × 3 pandiagonal magic squares must be trivial.

However, if the magic square concept is generalized to include geometric shapes instead of numbers – the geometric magic squares discovered by Lee Sallows – a 3 × 3 pandiagonal magic square does exist.

4×4 pandiagonal magic squares

The smallest non-trivial pandiagonal magic squares are 4 × 4 squares. All 4 × 4 pandiagonal magic squares must be translationally symmetric to the form

Since each 2 × 2 subsquare sums to the magic constant, 4 × 4 pandiagonal magic squares are most-perfect magic squares. In addition, the two numbers at the opposite corners of any 3 × 3 square add up to half the magic constant. Consequently, all 4 × 4 pandiagonal magic squares that are associative must have duplicate cells.

5×5 pandiagonal magic squares

There are many 5 × 5 pandiagonal magic squares.  Unlike 4 × 4 pandiagonal magic squares, these can be associative.  The following is a 5 × 5 associative pandiagonal magic square:

In addition to the rows, columns, and diagonals, a 5 × 5 pandiagonal magic square also shows its magic constant in four "quincunx" patterns, which in the above example are:

 17+25+13+1+9 = 65 (center plus adjacent row and column squares)
 21+7+13+19+5 = 65 (center plus the remaining row and column squares)
 4+10+13+16+22 = 65 (center plus diagonally adjacent squares)
 20+2+13+24+6 = 65 (center plus the remaining squares on its diagonals)

Each of these quincunxes can be translated to other positions in the square by cyclic permutation of the rows and columns (wrapping around), which in a pandiagonal magic square does not affect the equality of the magic constants.  This leads to 100 quincunx sums, including broken quincunxes analogous to broken diagonals.

The quincunx sums can be proved by taking linear combinations of the row, column, and diagonal sums.  Consider the pandiagonal magic square

with magic constant .  To prove the quincunx sum  (corresponding to the 20+2+13+24+6 = 65 example given above), we can add together the following:
From this sum, subtract the following:
 The column sum ,

(4n+2)×(4n+2) pandiagonal magic squares with nonconsecutive elements 
No pandiagonal magic square exists of order  if consecutive integers are used.  But certain sequences of nonconsecutive integers do admit order-() pandiagonal magic squares.

Consider the sum 1+2+3+5+6+7 = 24.  This sum can be divided in half by taking the appropriate groups of three addends, or in thirds using groups of two addends:

 1+5+6 = 2+3+7 = 12

 1+7 = 2+6 = 3+5 = 8

An additional equal partitioning of the sum of squares guarantees the semi-bimagic property noted below:

 12 + 52 + 62 = 22 + 32 + 72 = 62

Note that the consecutive integer sum 1+2+3+4+5+6 = 21, an odd sum, lacks the half-partitioning.

Then  (where  is the magic square with 1 for all cells) gives the nonconsecutive pandiagonal 6 × 6 square:

with a maximum element of 49 and a pandiagonal magic constant of 150.
This square is pandiagonal and semi-bimagic, that means that 
rows, columns, main diagonals and broken diagonals have a sum of 150 and, if we square all the numbers in the square, only the rows and the columns are magic and have a sum of 5150.

For 10th order a similar construction is possible using the equal partitionings of the sum 1+2+3+4+5+9+10+11+12+13 = 70:

 1+3+9+10+12 = 2+4+5+11+13 = 35

 1+13 = 2+12 = 3+11 = 4+10 = 5+9 = 14

 12 + 32 + 92 + 102 + 122 = 22 + 42 + 52 + 112 + 132 = 335 (equal partitioning of squares; semi-bimagic property)

This leads to squares having a maximum element of 169 and a pandiagonal magic constant of 850, which are also semi-bimagic with each row or column sum of squares equal to 102,850.

(6n±1)×(6n±1) pandiagonal magic squares

A  pandiagonal magic square can be built by the following algorithm.

4n×4n pandiagonal magic squares

A  pandiagonal magic square can be built by the following algorithm.

If we build a  pandiagonal magic square with this algorithm then every  square in the  square will have the same sum. Therefore, many symmetric patterns of  cells have the same sum as any row and any column of the  square. Especially each  and each  rectangle will have the same sum as any row and any column of the  square. The  square is also a most-perfect magic square.

(6n+3)×(6n+3) pandiagonal magic squares 
A  pandiagonal magic square can be built by the following algorithm.

References

 W. S. Andrews, Magic Squares and Cubes. New York: Dover, 1960.  Originally printed in 1917.  See especially Chapter X.

 Ollerenshaw, K., Brée, D.: Most-perfect pandiagonal magic squares. IMA, Southend-on-Sea (1998)

External links
 Panmagic Square at MathWorld
 http://www.azspcs.net/Contest/PandiagonalMagicSquares

Magic squares